George E. Tillson was an industrialist best known for founding the town of Tillsonburg. 

Tillson was born on November 25, 1782, in Enfield, Massachusetts. In 1808 he married Nancy Barker. Tillson moved to Upper Canada in 1822, and founded a small iron forge within Norfolk County with Hiram Capron and James and Benjamin Van Norman. In 1825 Tillson bought approximately 600 acres of land in the south-end of Oxford County along the Big Otter Creek using the funds earned from the forge. Tillson constructed a sawmill, lock, blast furnace and another iron forge in the area. Originally called the “Dereham Forge", the town was renamed ‘Tillsonburg’ in 1837 after its founder. Tillson died on March 15, 1864, in the town of Tillsonburg. His son E. D. Tillson constructed the Annandale House which has since been renovated and currently houses the Tillsonburg museum.

References

1782 births
1864 deaths
Canadian city founders
People from Enfield, Massachusetts
American emigrants to pre-Confederation Ontario